Grace Lynn Kung (born March 25, 1987) is a Canadian actress. She received a Canadian Screen Award nomination for the spy series InSecurity as Jojo Kwan.

Kung holds two certificates of distinction from Trinity College London in the United Kingdom, where she also studied naturopathic medicine. She has appeared in Fahrenheit 451, Star Trek: Discovery, Miss Sloane, and Designated Survivor.

Screen credits include The Expanse, The Strain, Being Erica, Away From Her, Slings & Arrows, Odd Squad, House Party, and Cube 2: Hypercube. On stage, she has performed The Vagina Monologues in Oranjestad, Aruba, as Janet in the award-winning play Kim's Convenience, Izzy in Seminar by Theresa Rebeck, Zoe/The Girl in La Ronde, Yuko in Yukonstyle at Canadian Stage Company, collaborating with Judith Thompson on her new works and playing writer-historian Iris Chang in the international debut of A Nanking Winter by Marjorie Chan at Nightwood Theatre, a theatre specialising in forging creative alliances among female artists.

Filmography

Films

Television

Video games

References

External links
 

1987 births
Living people
Canadian actresses of Chinese descent
Canadian expatriates in England
Canadian film actresses
Canadian stage actresses
Canadian television actresses
Actresses from Ottawa